The 1980 IBF World Championships were held in Jakarta, Indonesia in 1980.

Medalists

Medal table

Events

References

External links
http://newspapers.nl.sg/Digitised/Page/straitstimes19800528.1.26.aspx
http://newspapers.nl.sg/Digitised/Page/straitstimes19800529.1.28.aspx
http://newspapers.nl.sg/Digitised/Page/straitstimes19800530.1.34.aspx
http://newspapers.nl.sg/Digitised/Page/straitstimes19800531.1.30.aspx
https://web.archive.org/web/20061017031657/http://www.badminton.de/HE.951.0.html

 
BWF World Championships
IBF World Championships 1980
Badminton World Championships
Badminton World Championships
Sports competitions in Jakarta
Badminton tournaments in Indonesia